The 1978 FIFA World Cup UEFA–CONMEBOL qualification play-off was a two-legged home-and-away tie between the winners of UEFA Group 9, Hungary, and the last-placed team of the CONMEBOL final round, Bolivia. The matches were played on 29 October and 30 November 1977 in Budapest and La Paz, respectively.

After beating Bolivia in both matches (6–0 and 3–2), Hungary won 4–0 on points (9–2 on aggregate) and therefore qualified for the 1978 World Cup in Argentina. It was Bolivia's closest attempt to qualify for the World Cup, until the country secured a place sixteen years later.

Qualified teams

Venues

Match details

First leg

Second leg

References

Play-off Uefa-Conmebol
1978
FIFA
Hungary national football team matches
Bolivia national football team matches
October 1977 sports events in Europe
November 1977 sports events in South America
1970s in Budapest
20th century in La Paz
International sports competitions in Budapest
Sports competitions in La Paz
International association football competitions hosted by Hungary
International association football competitions hosted by Bolivia
1977 in Bolivian sport